Kalin Ivanovski (born 11 May 2004) is a Macedonian tennis player.

Ivanovski has a career high ATP singles ranking of 478 achieved on 20 February 2023. He also has a career high ATP doubles ranking of 995 achieved on 9 January 2023.

Ivanovski represents North Macedonia at the Davis Cup, where he has a win-loss record of 10-2.

ATP Challenger and ITF World Tennis Tour finals

Singles: 5 (3–2)

References

External links
 
 
 

2004 births
Living people
Macedonian male tennis players
Sportspeople from Skopje